Royal Air Force Banff or more simply RAF Banff is a former Royal Air Force station located  west of Banff, Aberdeenshire, Scotland and  northeast of Keith, Moray.

History
The airfield was sited on land belonging to the Earls of Seafield since the 16th century. Construction of the airfield began in the middle of 1942. After it was turned down by RAF Bomber Command, it was officially opened in April 1943 as an airfield for the use of No. 14 (Pilots) Advanced Flying Unit RAF of  RAF Flying Training Command. This unit used the airfield until August 1944, when it was disbanded and the airfield was handed over to RAF Coastal Command.

The following squadrons were posted here at some point:

Units

Current use
The site is now Boyndie Wind Farm.
A grass runway has been established at the Eastern end, operating as Boyndie Airstrip.

See also
 List of former Royal Air Force stations

References

Citations

Bibliography

Royal Air Force stations of World War II in the United Kingdom
Royal Air Force stations in Scotland
RAF
Defunct airports in Scotland
Airports established in 1943